The Justice and Welfare Party (UCID), sometimes translated as the Justice and Welfare Association, is the oldest political party in Somaliland. The party tends to be supported by people from the Garhajis clan and some sub-clans of the Dir.

UCID was founded in 2001 by Somaliland politician Faysal Ali Warabe, with its program being inspired by that of the Finnish Social Democratic Party. Mr. Waraabe also serves as its Chairman. The party has been described as the only one at a national level to adhere to a specific political ideology.

Based in Hargeisa, the political party came in third place during the 2003 Somaliland presidential election, receiving 16% of the votes.

In the parliamentary elections held on 29 September 2005, the party won 26.9% of the vote and 21 out of 82 seats.

Electoral history

Presidential elections

Parliamentary elections

Local elections

See also
 Somaliland
 List of political parties in Somaliland

References
Specific

General

External links
 

Political parties in Somaliland
2001 establishments in Somaliland
Political parties established in 2001